"A Roosevelt" (To Roosevelt) is a poem by Nicaraguan poet Rubén Darío. The poem was written by Darío in January 1904 in Málaga, Spain.  It is a reaction to the involvement of the United States during the Separation of Panama from Colombia.

References

External links 

 

Nicaraguan literature
Cultural depictions of Theodore Roosevelt
1904 poems